Beyond the Red Mirror is the tenth studio album by German power metal band Blind Guardian, released on 30 January  2015 through Nuclear Blast. 

A concept album and a sequel to Imaginations from the Other Side, Beyond the Red Mirror has been described by singer Hansi Kürsch as "a story between science fiction and fantasy. [...] The two worlds described have changed dramatically for the worse since then. While there used to be several passages between the worlds, there is only one gate left now: The Red Mirror. It has to be found at any cost."

It is their first album without former session member Oliver Holzwarth on bass guitar since 1995's Imaginations from the Other Side, with Barend Courbois replacing him. "Twilight of the Gods" was released as a single to promote this album.

Critical reception

Beyond the Red Mirror has received positive reviews. Ray Van Horn Jr. of Blabbermouth.net, who gave the album a rating of nine-and-a-half out of ten stated, "Previewing their tenth album Beyond the Red Mirror with the previously-released Twilight of the Gods single, German power-symphonic metal maestros Blind Guardian capitalize on a long break with an encompassing and magical effort. For Beyond the Red Mirror, the band worked with three different worldwide choirs from Budapest, Prague and Boston, along with two full-scale orchestras bearing 90 members apiece. The results are as larger-than-life as the band intended, fleshing out a sci-fi and fantasy piece bridged to their 1995 album, Imaginations from the Other Side."

Track listing

Bonus tracks limited, vinyl, and earbook versions
"Chapter IV. The Mirror Speaks", which contains only one track, "Distant Memories", was put right between the two tracks "Chapter III. Disturbance in the Here and Now". This caused the second track from that chapter, "The Holy Grail", to end up in a new chapter, "V. Disturbance in the Here and Now (Reprise)". "Chapter IX. Damnation", which contains only one track, "Doom", is just a bonus epilogue chapter.

Some copies of the earbook came with a bonus vinyl disc, containing alternate versions of two album tracks.

Lyrical references 
 "Sacred Mind" may refer to Shangdu, the capital city of Kublai Khan's empire, particularly as referenced in Samuel Taylor Coleridge's poem "Kubla Khan". It could also be inferred to be about Xanadu, the large estate owned by the title character in the 1941 film Citizen Kane.
 The bonus track "Doom" was originally written for Nightfall in Middle-Earth. The version on this album has slightly rewritten lyrics to be able to fit the concept of this album better.  It originally depicted Húrin being cursed by Morgoth, and traces of that idea appeared here while still showing what happened after "Grand Parade".  "Doom" also appears on the 2018 deluxe edition of Nightfall in Middle-Earth with the original lyrics.

Personnel
 Blind Guardian
Hansi Kürsch – vocals
André Olbrich – lead, rhythm and acoustic guitars
Marcus Siepen – rhythm guitar
Frederik Ehmke – drums, percussion

 Additional personnel
Barend Courbois – bass
Michael Schüren – piano
Mattias Ulmer – keyboards, piano
Thomas Hackmann, William "Billy" King, Olaf Senkbeil – the choir company
Charlie Bauerfeind – production
Felipe Machado Franco – cover and booklet artworks

 Orchestras
Hungarian Studio Orchestra Budapest (Peter Pejtsik – conductor)
FILMharmonic Orchestra Prague (Adam Klemens – conductor)

 Choirs
Hungarian Studio Choir Budapest (Peter Pejtsik – conductor)
FILMharmonic Choir Prague (Stanislav Mistr – conductor)
Vox Futura Choir Boston (Andrew Shenton – conductor)

Chart performance
Weekly charts

References

2015 albums
Blind Guardian albums
Nuclear Blast albums
Albums produced by Charlie Bauerfeind
Concept albums
Sequel albums